Catharinus Elling (13 September 1858 – 8 January 1942) was a Norwegian music teacher, organist, music critic  and composer. He was also a folk music collector and the author of a number of books.

Biography
Elling was born in Christiania (now Oslo), Norway.  He was the son of Andreas Schaft Elling (1818–1872) and Pauline Bangsboe (1826–1905).  His brother was engineer Ægidius Elling (1861–1949).

He studied piano and composition in Leipzig from 1877–78. In 1886 he received a scholarship and studied music at Professor Heinrich von Herzogenberg at  Hochschule für Musik in  Berlin from 1886–1887.
From 1896–1908, he was teacher at Oslo Conservatory of Music. He was also  organist at Gamlebyen Church in Kristiania from (1908–26). He  was also  music critic  at Dagbladet  (1881–82), Ny Illustreret Tidende (1884–86) and Morgenposten (1903–07). Additionally he also acted as conductor of Drammens sangforening  (1897–1901).

As a composer, he wrote symphonies, a violin concerto, chamber music, an opera, and more than 200 songs, most in the 1890–1905 period. His works are seldom performed now, but many musicians were influenced by him, such as Fartein Valen, who studied music under Elling.

Elling is principally  known for his extensive work on collecting and recording Norwegian folk music.
Elling was named a Government scholar in 1899. He continued a folk music collection across many rural parts of the country: Trøndelag,  Gudbrandsdalen, Oppland, Telemark, Setesdal, Valdres  and Sunnfjord. At the same time, folk music collector Olav Sande (1850–1927) was also named to a state stipend, and the two  divided the country between them; Sande taking the music tradition from Sogn to Vest-Agder. Elling's mandate was to collect music and also work to preserve it. He published a range of music books with titles such as Norske folkemelodier for klaver, Norske folkeviser for sang og klaver and Slåtter for fiolin og klaver. Both at the time, and since, he has been criticised for wanting to rearrange folk music to fit with classical music's style.

Selected compositions
Symfoni i A-dur, 1890
Kosakkerne,  1890–94
D"en forlorne søn,   1895–96
Symfoni i a-moll, 1897
Kong Inge og Gregorius Dagsøn,  1898
Norsk suite, 1903–04

Selected books
Vore folkemelodier, 1909
Norsk folkemusikk, 1922
Sprogforholdet inden vore folkemelodier, 1930
Nye bidrag til belysning af norsk folkemusik, 1933
Religiøse folketoner for blandet kor, 1904–19
Religiøse folketoner for sang og klaver, 1907–18
Norske folkeviser for sang og klaver, 1908–25
Norske folkemelodier for klaver, 1911

References

Other sources
Finn Benestad, Nils Grinde, Harald Herresthal (1999) Norges musikkhistorie: romantikk og gullalder. 1870–1910. (Oslo: Aschehoug)

External links

1858 births
1942 deaths
19th-century classical composers
19th-century conductors (music)
19th-century Norwegian composers
19th-century Norwegian organists
20th-century classical composers
20th-century conductors (music)
20th-century Norwegian male musicians
20th-century Norwegian composers
20th-century Norwegian organists
Burials at Vestre gravlund
Male conductors (music)
Male organists
Musicians from Oslo
Norwegian classical composers
Norwegian conductors (music)
Norwegian folk-song collectors
Norwegian male classical composers
Norwegian music critics
Norwegian music educators
Norwegian organists
Norwegian Romantic composers